Captain Frederick Marryat  (10 July 1792 – 9 August 1848) was a Royal Navy officer, a novelist, and an acquaintance of Charles Dickens. He is noted today as an early pioneer of nautical fiction, particularly for his semi-autobiographical novel Mr Midshipman Easy (1836). He is remembered also for his children's novel The Children of the New Forest (1847), and for a widely used system of maritime flag signalling known as Marryat's Code.

Early life and naval career
Marryat was born in Great George Street, Westminster, London, the son of Joseph Marryat, a "merchant prince" and member of Parliament, as well as slave owner and anti-abolitionist, and his American wife, Charlotte, née von Geyer. Marryat tried to run away to sea several times before he was permitted to enter the Royal Navy in 1806 as a midshipman aboard , a frigate commanded by Lord Cochrane, who later served as inspiration for Marryat and other authors.

Marryat's time aboard the Imperieuse included action off the Gironde, the rescue of a fellow midshipman who had fallen overboard, captures of many ships off the Mediterranean coast of Spain, and capture of the castle of Montgat. The Imperieuse shifted to operations in the Scheldt in 1809, where Marryat contracted malaria; he returned to England on the 74-gun HMS Victorious. After recuperating, he returned to the Mediterranean in the 74-gun HMS Centaur and again saved a shipmate by leaping into the sea after him. He then sailed as a passenger to Bermuda in the 64-gun HMS Atlas, and from there to Halifax, Nova Scotia on the schooner HMS Chubb, where he joined the 32-gun frigate HMS Aeolus on 27 April 1811.

A few months later, Marryat once more earned distinction by leading the effort to cut away the Aeolus'''s mainyard to save the ship during a storm, and continuing a pattern, saved one of the men from the sea. Shortly after, he moved to the frigate HMS Spartan, participating in the capture of a number of American ships during the War of 1812. Marryat led four barges from the Newcastle on a raid against Orleans, Massachusetts on 19 December 1814, the last combat in New England during the war. The affair had mixed results. Initially, Marryat cut out an American schooner and three sloops, but he managed to escape with just one sloop. The local militia avoided casualties while killing one Royal marine. Marryat was promoted to commander on 13 June 1815, just as the war ended.

After the war
Marryat then turned to scientific studies. He invented a lifeboat which earned him a gold medal from the Royal Humane Society and the nickname "Lifeboat". He developed a practical, widely used system of maritime flag signalling known as Marryat's Code based on his experience in the Napoleonic Wars escorting merchant ships in convoys. He also described a new gastropod genus Cyclostrema with the type species Cyclostrema cancellatum.

In 1819, Marryat married Catherine Shairp with whom he had four sons and seven daughters, including Florence, a prolific novelist and his biographer; Emilia, a writer of moralist adventure novels in her father's vein; and Augusta, also a writer of adventure fiction.

In 1820, Marryat commanded the sloop HMS Beaver and temporarily commanded HMS Rosario for the purpose of bringing back despatches announcing the death of Napoleon on Saint Helena. He also took the chance to make a sketch of Napoleon's body on his deathbed, which was later published as a lithograph. His artistic skills were modest, but he made numerous sketches of shipboard life above and below deck.

In 1823, Marryat was appointed to HMS Larne and took part in an expedition against Burma in 1824, which resulted in large losses from disease. He was promoted to command the 28-gun HMS Tees, which gave him the rank of post-captain. He was back in England in 1826, and that year donated two Burmese curiosities to the British Museum, in an unsuccessful effort to become a trustee.British Museum Collection In 1829, he was commanding the frigate HMS Ariadne on a search for shoals around the Madeira and Canary Islands. This was an uninspiring exercise, and as his first novel The Naval Officer had just been published, he decided to resign his commission in November 1830 and take up writing full time.

Literary career
From 1832 to 1835, Marryat edited The Metropolitan Magazine. Additionally, he kept producing novels; his biggest success came with Mr Midshipman Easy in 1836. He lived in Brussels for a year, travelled in Canada and the United States, then moved to London in 1839, where he was in the literary circle of Charles Dickens and others. He was in North America in 1837 when the rebellion of that year broke out in Lower Canada, and served with the expeditionary force sent to suppress it.

Marryat was named a Fellow of the Royal Society in recognition of his invention and other achievements. In 1843, he moved to a farm at Manor Cottage, Langham in Norfolk, where he died in 1848. His daughter Florence Marryat later became known as a writer and actress. His son Francis Samuel Marryat completed his father's late novel The Little Savage.

Marryat's novels are typical of their time, with concerns of family connections and social status often overshadowing the naval action, but they are interesting as fictional renditions of the author's 25 years' experience at sea. Among those who admired them were Mark Twain, Joseph Conrad, and Ernest Hemingway, and as the first nautical novels, served as models for later works by C. S. Forester and Patrick O'Brian, also set in the time of Nelson and telling of young men rising through the ranks through successes as naval officers.

Marryat was also known for short writings on nautical subjects. These short stories, plays, pieces of travel journalism, and essays appeared in The Metropolitan Magazine too, and were later published in book form as Olla Podrida. Marryat's 1839 Gothic novel The Phantom Ship contained The White Wolf of the Hartz Mountains, which includes the first female werewolf to appear in a short story.

In 1839, Marryat also published his Diary in America, a travelogue that reflects his criticisms of American culture and society. The book and the author were both subject to acts of violence, including the burning of the book and of Marryat's effigy in public.

Controversy arose among Marryat's readers. Some criticized him for careless writing, others admired his vivacity about life at sea. His later novels were generally for the children's market, including his most famous novel today: The Children of the New Forest, published in 1847 and set in the countryside round the village of Sway, Hampshire.

Works

Family connections
Marryat's niece Augusta Sophia Marryat married Sir Henry Young, who served as Governor of South Australia and Tasmania. A suburb, Marryatville, and the town of Port Augusta were named after her. Augusta's brother Charles Marryat was the first Anglican Dean of Adelaide.

References

Further reading
David Hannay, Life of Marryat (1889)
Florence Marryat, Life and Letters (1872)
Oliver Warner, Captain Marryat: a Rediscovery'' (1953)

External links

Biography at the Dictionary of Canadian Biography Online

Free ebooks of Marryat books optimised for printing at home, plus short Marryat bibliography
Link to National Portrait Gallery, London
Buddha statue donated by Captain Marryat to British Museum

Stuart A. Rose Manuscript, Archives, and Rare Book Library, Emory University: Frederick Marryat papers, 1830-1842

1792 births
1848 deaths
English children's writers
19th-century English novelists
Royal Navy officers
Maritime writers
English historical novelists
Nautical historical novelists
Fellows of the Royal Society
Royal Navy personnel of the War of 1812
Royal Navy personnel of the Napoleonic Wars
Royal Navy personnel of the French Revolutionary Wars
English male novelists
Victorian novelists
Writers from London
Companions of the Order of the Bath
Writers of Gothic fiction
Writers of historical fiction set in the early modern period